Lo vedi come sei... lo vedi come sei? is a 1939 Italian "white-telephones" comedy film directed by Mario Mattoli and starring Erminio Macario. The film's sets were designed by the art director Cinecittà Studios.

Cast
 Erminio Macario - Michele Bernisconi (as Macario)
 Franca Gioieta - Rosetta
 Amleto Filippi - Tommaso Bernisconi
 Enzo Biliotti - Il notaio Cassetta
 Lina Tartara Minora - Adelaide (as Paola Minora)
 Carlo Rizzo - Il venditore di cravatte
 Vinicio Sofia - Il sindaco del paese
 Carlo Campanini - Il postino
 Greta Gonda - Emily
 Armando Migliari - L'imbonitore al lunapark

References

External links

1939 films
Italian comedy films
1930s Italian-language films
1939 comedy films
Italian black-and-white films
Films directed by Mario Mattoli
Films shot at Cinecittà Studios
1930s Italian films